Lončari is a village in the municipality of Donji Žabar, Bosnia and Herzegovina. 
It is home to the football club FK Mladost Lončari.

Populated places in Donji Žabar
Villages in Republika Srpska